John Leehane (born 11 December 1950) is an Australian former cricketer. He played eleven first-class cricket matches for Victoria between 1978 and 1981.

See also
 List of Victoria first-class cricketers

References

External links
 

1950 births
Living people
Australian cricketers
Victoria cricketers
Cricketers from Melbourne